Irini Mouchou (also transliterated as Mouhou by the International Triathlon Union; born 7 January 1987 in Mytilene, Lesbos) is a Greek professional triathlete and Greek National Champion of the year 2009.

From 2005 to 2009 Mouchou took part in 18 ITU events and achieved eight top-ten positions.
In 2009, she won the gold medal in the Triathlon Balkan Championships in Varna and at the same time placed 6th in the European Cup ranking of the same competition.

In 2008 Mouchou had placed 3rd in the Balkan Championships and 2nd in the Greek Championships and had taken part in several non-ITU triathlons such as the British Corus Elite Series in London (19th), and the Swiss Elite VW Circuit Triathlons in Geneva (8th) and in Uster (9th).

On 18 August 2009 Mouchou announced her plans to join the Elite section of the French Club TOC Cesson Sevigne, among whose non-French elite members there are sportswomen like Irina Abysova, in order to prepare for the 2012 Olympics.
On 24 October 2009, however, Mouchou announced her temporary retreat from triathlon, giving precedence to her university studies.

Mouchou’s Greek sports clubs are ATLAS in Mytilene (ΑΤΛΑΣ Β.ΜΥΤΙΛΗΝΗΣ) and AIGALEO (Α.Γ.Σ. ΑΙΓΑΛΕΩ) in Athens.

ITU Competitions 
The following list is based upon the official ITU rankings and the Athlete's Profile Page. Unless indicated otherwise, the competitions are triathlons (Olympic Distance) and belong to the Elite category.

BG = the sponsor British Gas · DNS = did not start · DNF = did not finish

Notes

External links 
 Mouchou’s Homepage in Greek
 Greek Triathlon Federation in Greek
 ITU Profile Page

1987 births
Living people
Greek female triathletes
People from Mytilene
Sportspeople from the North Aegean